Chris Jarvis may refer to:
Chris Jarvis (presenter) (born 1969), British presenter of children's television programmes
Chris Jarvis (actor) (born 1980), British actor best known for his role in The Bill
Chris Jarvis (rower) (born 1980), Canadian Olympic rower